Pepsi Tate (10 March 1965 – 18 September 2007) was the bass guitarist of Welsh glam metal band Tigertailz, who made the Top 40 in the UK Albums Chart in the early 1990s.

Born as Huw Justin Smith, son of Dempsey and Makepeace actor Ray Smith, Pepsi Tate grew up in the village of Dinas Powys, just outside Cardiff.

After his career with Tigertailz Justin pursued a career in television as a producer and director. His work for BBC Wales included directing the weekly politics programme, Dragon's Eye.

The Thrill Pistol album (released on 27 August 2007) featured his last recordings. It was dedicated to Pepsi and his family.

On 18 September 2007, aged 42, Pepsi Tate died after suffering with pancreatic cancer. He died at Holme Towers Cancer Hospice in Penarth only a few weeks after he had married his longtime partner, Welsh opera singer Shân Cothi.

References

1965 births
2007 deaths
Welsh rock bass guitarists
Deaths from pancreatic cancer
Musicians from Cardiff
Deaths from cancer in Wales
20th-century bass guitarists